Springer School and Center is a school in Cincinnati, Ohio dedicated to helping students with learning disabilities (LD) to lead successful lives.

Learning Programs 
The schools programs address several reasons that cause students to struggle in school including those identified by the National Center for Learning Disabilities as common learning disabilities, such as:
 Dyslexia: a learning disability in reading
 Dyscalculia: a learning disability in math
 Dysgraphia: a struggle to produce written content
Other difficulties affect learning include ADHD and executive functioning deficits. Springer's program is entirely designed and dedicated to helping empower students with learning disabilities to lead successful lives.

Springer describes its programs as holistic, because they address the educational, social and emotional needs of children with LD and helps students to understand themselves as learners in a nurturing environment.

In addition to the school, Springer's Center provides educational programs and resources for students, parents and professionals affected by learning disabilities.  Its summer programs help students get a head start on next year, evening programs for parents help them understand their children with LD or ADHD and provide strategies for managing at home, and professional programs provide quality professional development opportunities for educators and clinicians.

History 
It was established in 1887 as the Cathedral School for the Archdiocese. Philanthropist Reuben Runyan Springer donated the funds to create the school, which served children with special needs, initially for hearing-impaired students.

In 1968, a community needs assessment conducted by the University of Cincinnati prompted Springer to expand focus to educating children with learning disabilities. Springer was an archdiocesan school until 1971, when it became an independent elementary school.

Before 1981, the school occupied several different buildings.  In 1981, it moved into the former St. Mary High School.

Since 1992, Springer has been accredited through the Independent Schools Association of the Central States, see National Association of Independent Schools.

The Springer Center opened in 1999 to provide information, services, and programs related to learning disabilities.

External links 
 National Center for Learning Disabilities

References 

Schools in Ohio